Theodore Roosevelt spent his first summer in Oyster Bay with his family in 1874. Through the ensuing years as he rose to power, Oyster Bay would frequently serve as backdrop and stage on which many of his ambitions were realized. Several places connected to Theodore Roosevelt in his lifetime remain, while others have been lost. A number of efforts to memorialize Roosevelt in Oyster Bay have been made since his death in 1919.

Chronology 
1874 - First summer Theodore Roosevelt spends in Oyster Bay; at a home rented by the     Roosevelts on Cove Neck Road that they named "Tranquility".
1878 - Theodore Roosevelt Sr., father of Theodore Roosevelt, dies February 9 in New York City.  Memorial services later held at First Presbyterian Church of Oyster Bay.
1880 - At age 22 Roosevelt purchased  of land for $30,000 on Cove Neck, planning to build a house there.
1884 - Roosevelt's mother and wife die in their New York home on the same day.
1885 - Work continues on Oyster Bay home and Roosevelt's sister Anna occupies the house along with his baby by his late wife, Alice.
1886 - Roosevelt remarries to Edith Kermit Carow, a childhood friend.
1887 - Theodore and Edith occupy their Oyster Bay home in the spring.
1902 - First summer as President in Oyster Bay
1903 - 2nd summer as President in Oyster Bay
Civil War Parrott gun, ca. 1861, donated by US Navy and dedicated by Roosevelt.
1904 - 3rd summer as President in Oyster Bay
1905 - 4th summer as President in Oyster Bay
Roosevelt helps to negotiate peace in Russo-Japanese War. Treaty of Portsmouth signed September 5.
1906 - 5th summer as President in Oyster Bay
Roosevelt addresses the crowd on July 4, saying "The best way to be good citizens of this nation is to be good citizens of Oyster Bay".
1907 - 6th summer as President in Oyster Bay
1908 - Final summer as President in Oyster Bay
1919 - Theodore Roosevelt dies January 6, buried at Youngs Memorial Cemetery
1926 - Theodore Roosevelt Memorial Window installed in the Matinecock Masonic Lodge building.
1947 - Theodore Roosevelt Monument Assemblage moved and dedicated in TR Memorial Park on October 25
1948 - Edith Roosevelt dies
1953 - Sagamore Hill opened to the public as a museum on June 14, 1953
1962 - Congress establishes Sagamore Hill National Historic Site on July 25 to preserve the house as a unit of the National Park Service
1981 - Derby-Hall Bandstand replica built on site of original bandstand
1984 - Theodore Roosevelt Bust by C.B. Clas, placed outside of Town Hall in Oyster Bay.
1991 - Theodore Roosevelt Monument Assemblage re-dedicated in TR Memorial Park on June 23
2005 - Oyster Bay Long Island Rail Road Station and Oyster Bay Long Island Rail Road Turntable listed on the National Register of Historic Places
2005 - Theodore Roosevelt Equestrian Sculpture dedicated October 29
2008 - "Teddy's Fourth of July" painting completed

Places associated with Roosevelt during his lifetime

Extant

First Presbyterian Church of Oyster Bay - Built in 1873, this would be the home church that Theodore Roosevelt Sr. and his family would use. His memorial services occurred here in 1878.
Christ Church of Oyster Bay - Fourth church on site built in the 1878. Wood trusses in nave and small section of Roosevelt family pews remain. President Roosevelt attended church here. Funeral service held here before being buried in Youngs Memorial Cemetery. Many of family have memorial plaques on walls.  Enlarged in 1925 and encased in stone and stained glass windows modelled after those in Chartres added.
Snouders Drug Store, 108 South Street, Oyster Bay - Location of the first telegraph in Oyster Bay. Frequently used for Roosevelt as Governor of New York and President to issue orders, and by the press corps to transmit messages from the "Summer White House" in Oyster Bay.
Sagamore Hill National Historic Site, 20 Sagamore Hill Drive, Oyster Bay -  Primary residence of Theodore Roosevelt and Edith Roosevelt from 1886 and for the rest of their lives. Served as the "Summer White House" during the seven summers (1902–1908).
Oyster Bay, 102 Audrey Ave, Oyster Bay - Original Oyster Bay LIRR station, built on June 25, 1889 and remodeled in 1902. Efforts are underway presently to transform the former station into a Railroad Museum.
Octagon Hotel, 67 West Main Street, Oyster Bay - A popular social and political meeting place, first built in 1851. When running for Governor of New York State, Roosevelt's offices were located here.
Oyster Bay Bank Building, 20 Audrey Ave, Oyster Bay - First built in 1891. Theodore Roosevelt offices as Governor of New York were located on the 2nd floor. In 1901 became a Mason and attended Masonic meetings on 3rd floor as his schedule would permit.
Moore's Building, 1 East Main Street, Oyster Bay - Originally a grocery store built in 1901. Large second floor meeting space was often used for public meetings. While Roosevelt was President his staff occupied the second floor.

Demolished 

Fleet's Hall - is a building that served as an important civic and social meeting place during the time that Theodore Roosevelt was a resident of Oyster Bay and served as Governor of New York State and later President of the United States. The building was used for events such as public meetings, concerts, receptions, dances, and dinners. It was also the site of the first moving picture screening in Oyster Bay.
Bandstand, Shore Ave - The original bandstand was located in a triangular park adjacent to Town Hall where Roosevelt gave speeches. The bandstand was demolished in the 1930s.
Oyster Bay Fire Company #1 - Built in 1895 and located at 32 Summit St on the location where the Earle-Wightman House is today. Used for "Visiting Brethren" on the occasion of Theodore Roosevelt's "raising" in the Masonic order on April 24, 1901. Destroyed by fire and subsequently demolished.
Matinecock Masonic Lodge, Oyster Bay - While Roosevelt never visited this building when it operated as a lodge, he may have visited when it served as the Oyster Bay Inn before being converted for use as a masonic lodge. The lodge did not move to this space until the 1920s after Roosevelt had died. Artifacts and memorabilia forming a Masonic Museum were located here. The building was destroyed by fire October 2003.

Memorials built after Roosevelt's death 

Theodore Roosevelt Sanctuary and Audubon Center - established as the first Audubon Songbird Sanctuary in the nation.  were donated in 1923 by W. Emlen and Christine Roosevelt in memory of their cousin, the late Theodore Roosevelt.
Theodore Roosevelt Memorial Window - installed in the Matinecock Masonic Lodge building in 1926. The window was designed and crafted by local artisan Oliver Smith, who had studied windows in cathedrals in England and France. Smith was also responsible for design of new stained glass windows in Christ Church.
Theodore Roosevelt Memorial Park - This beautiful waterfront park gives residents and visitors alike access to the pristine and beautiful Oyster Bay Harbor. Opened in 1928 and donated to the Town of Oyster Bay in 1942.
U.S. Post Office, Oyster Bay - Built in 1936. Adorned by five murals depicting scenes from 1653 to 1936, terra cotta panels depicting continents symbolized by panels. Leo Lentelli terra cotta bust and flag pole base outside.
Theodore Roosevelt Monument Assemblage, 1947 - Moved from Great Neck and re-dedicated on October 25, 1947 in Theodore Roosevelt Memorial Park.
Derby-Hall Bandstand, Shore Ave - Replica in 1981 to replace original bandstand destroyed in the 1930s.
Theodore Roosevelt Bust, 74 Audrey Avenue - Theodore Roosevelt Bust by C.B. Clas, placed outside of Town Hall in Oyster Bay. Surveyed by Save Outdoor Sculpture in 1994. Condition noted as "well maintained". Bronze plaque accompanying bust restored September 2008.
Theodore Roosevelt Monument Assemblage, 1991 - Original monument moved and dedicated on this site in 1947 was re-dedicated June 23, 1991.
Theodore Roosevelt Equestrian Sculpture - Created from mold created by Alexander Phimister Proctor in 1921, cast and moved to Oyster Bay. Dedicated on October 29, 2005.
Teddy's Fourth of July - This painting commissioned by Roger Bahnik and painted by Mort Kunstler, depicts Theodore Roosevelt astride a Model T on July 4, 1908. The Moore's Building is located in the background. The painting was completed in 2008 and limited-edition giclees and prints are available for sale to the public.

References 

Theodore Roosevelt
History of Oyster Bay (town), New York